Colin Ebelthite and Rameez Junaid were the defending champions, but decided not to compete.

Gerard Granollers and Jordi Samper Montaña won the title, defeating Adrián Menéndez-Maceiras and Rubén Ramírez Hidalgo in the final, 7–6(7–1), 6–2.

Seeds

Draw

Draw

References
 Main Draw

Franken Challengeandnbsp;- Doubles
2014 Doubles